Déjà Vu is a 2006 American science fiction action film directed by Tony Scott, written by Bill Marsilii and Terry Rossio, and produced by Jerry Bruckheimer. The film stars Denzel Washington, Paula Patton, Jim Caviezel, Val Kilmer, Adam Goldberg and Bruce Greenwood. It involves an ATF agent who travels back in time in an attempt to prevent a domestic terrorist attack that takes place in New Orleans and to save a woman with whom he falls in love.

Filming took place in New Orleans after Hurricane Katrina. The film premiered in New York City on November 20, 2006, and was released in the United States and Canada on November 22, 2006. It received mixed reviews from critics and earned $180 million worldwide against its $75 million production budget. It was the 23rd most successful film worldwide for 2006. The film was nominated for six awards, winning the International Gold Reel Award.

Plot
In New Orleans, a ferry carrying U.S. Navy sailors and their families across the Mississippi River for Mardi Gras explodes, killing 543 people. ATF Special Agent Doug Carlin discovers evidence of a bomb planted by a domestic terrorist, and examines the body of Claire Kuchever, seemingly killed in the explosion but found in the river shortly before the blast. Informing Claire's father and searching her apartment, Doug learns that she called his ATF office the morning of the bombing, and determines that she was abducted and killed by the bomber hours before the explosion.

Impressed with Doug, FBI Special Agent Paul Pryzwarra invites him to join a new governmental unit investigating the bombing. Led by Dr. Alexander Denny, the team utilizes a surveillance program called "Snow White", which they claim uses previous satellite footage to form a triangulated image of events four-and-a-half days in the past. Convinced that Claire is a vital link, Doug observes her past footage and is able to track the soon-to-be-bomber when he calls about a truck she has for sale.

Deducing that Snow White is actually a time window, Doug persuades the team to send a note to his past self with the time and place the suspect will be. His partner Larry Minuti finds the note instead, and is shot attempting to arrest the suspect and taken outside of Snow White's range. Doug is able to follow the suspect's past movements using a mobile Snow White unit, witnessing him kill Minuti.

In the present, the bomber is taken into custody after facial recognition systems identify him as Carroll Oerstadt, an unstable "patriot" rejected from enlisting in the military. He confesses to killing Minuti and Claire, taking her truck to transport the bomb and staging her death as one of the ferry victims. The government closes the investigation, but Doug, convinced that Snow White can alter history, persuades Denny to send him into the past to save Claire and stop the bombing.

Doug survives the process by being sent back to a hospital emergency room, where doctors are able to revive him. Stealing a gun and an ambulance, he arrives in time to stop Claire's murder, while Oerstadt shoots him and flees with the bomb. Doug drives Claire to her apartment to treat his wound, but a suspicious Claire holds him at gunpoint and calls the ATF to confirm his identity — the call his office received the day of the bombing. He convinces her of the truth, realizing that he unknowingly came across evidence in the present of his visit to the past.

Doug boards the ferry to find the bomb in Claire's truck, but Oerstadt realizes he has been followed and captures Claire, tying her to her truck's steering wheel. A gunfight ensues, but Doug distracts Oerstadt with information from his future interrogation, and Claire rams him with the truck, allowing Doug to shoot him dead. Surrounded by police and out of time to disarm the bomb, Doug drives the vehicle into the river, saving the passengers as Claire swims free, but he is unable to escape and dies in the subsequent underwater explosion. Mourning his death, Claire is approached by the Doug Carlin from her present timeline.

Cast
 Denzel Washington as ATF Special Agent Douglas Carlin
 Paula Patton as Claire Kuchever
 Jim Caviezel as Carroll Oerstadt         
 Val Kilmer as FBI Special Agent Paul Pryzwarra
 Adam Goldberg as Dr. Alexander Denny        
 Elden Henson as Gunnars
 Erika Alexander as Shanti
 Bruce Greenwood as FBI Special Agent-in-Charge Jack McCready
 Matt Craven as ATF Special Agent Larry Minuti    
 Elle Fanning as Abbey
 Enrique Castillo as Claire's father

Background and production

Script
The idea of a time travel thriller film originated between screenwriters Bill Marsilii and Terry Rossio, who were friends. Rossio had a one-page idea for a film called Prior Conviction about a cop who uses a Time Window to look seven days into the past to investigate his girlfriend's murder. As they were talking about it, Marsilii says "I had this explosive kind of epiphany—"NO! He should fall in love with her *while* he's watching the last few days of her life. The first time he sees her should be at her autopsy!"

Rossio later wrote, "The first concept was good, and the second concept was good, too, and together they were great. Ideas and issues and themes seemed to resonate, and in the end the screenplay felt as if it was telling a single powerful story."

Marsilii and Rossio wrote the script together. They communicated via email in attempts to develop the plot due to communication difficulties.

However, the creation of Déjà Vus progenitor was set aside by the September 11, 2001 attacks that disrupted New York-native Marsilii, and the advent of the 2003 film Pirates of the Caribbean: The Curse of the Black Pearl, which occupied Los Angeles-native Rossio. However, by 2004, the two screenwriters had completed the concept. Brian Greene from Columbia University was brought in as a consultant to help create a scientifically plausible feel to the script. Greene stated "the way I try to explain wormholes in terms of bending paper and connecting the corners, that's there in the film and it was fun to see that that made it in."

The script was sold for a record $5 million.

It was bought by Jerry Bruckheimer who got Denzel Washington to star and Tony Scott to direct. Rossio later wrote that Scott was "Completely the wrong choice, in that Tony had stated he had no interest in making a science fiction film, and suggested the time travel aspect be dumped. ... My hope was that we had a screenplay that could be the next Sixth Sense. Tony wanted to make just another also-ran surveillance film."

Rossio says at one point Scott quit the project and he and Marsilii had to work on the script so that Denzel would not quit. They reworked the script over two weeks and "the revision was deemed so good that not only did Denzel re-commit, he called Tony and talked him into coming back on board. Reportedly Denzel made Tony look him in the eye and swear he wouldn't quit the movie again. Tony said yes, but on one condition—he wanted to bring on his own writers."

Filming
Principal photography in New Orleans, Louisiana, was delayed following Hurricane Katrina because of the devastation caused by the storm and the collapse of the levees. Many of the exteriors were set to be shot in New Orleans, including a key sequence involving the Canal Street Ferry across the Mississippi River. After the city was reopened, the cast and crew returned to New Orleans to continue filming. Some scenes of the post-Katrina devastation were worked into the plot, including those in the Lower 9th Ward; additionally, evidence of Katrina's impact on the city was worked into the script. The filming crew spent two weeks filming a scene at the Four Mile Bayou in Morgan City, Louisiana.

According to director Tony Scott, Déjà Vu was written to take place on Long Island, but after a visit to New Orleans Scott felt that it would be a far better venue. Jerry Bruckheimer reportedly said that Denzel Washington was "adamant about returning to New Orleans to film after Hurricane Katrina devastated the region", but Washington recalled being neutral on the subject, while agreeing that it was "a good thing to spend money there and put people to work there".

To create a sense of realism, Scott and Washington interviewed numerous men and women whose real-life occupations pertained to positions in the Federal Bureau of Investigation and the Bureau of Alcohol, Tobacco, Firearms and Explosives; Washington has noted that he and Scott conducted similar research during the productions of Man on Fire and Crimson Tide.

Visual effects
Visual effects editor Marc Varisco, who had previously collaborated with director Scott on the 2005 film Domino, worked again with Scott to develop Déjà Vu into a fully-fledged work. In total, approximately 400 visual effects scenes were shot during the production of Déjà Vu. They had acquired a LIDAR device, which incorporated lasers to scatter light with the intent of mapping out a small region, during the production of Domino; Scott and Varisco decided to use the apparatus again during the production of Déjà Vu. Additionally, the two utilized the Panavision Genesis high definition camera to film the shots that would encompass the past that the Snow White team would peer at throughout the film, as well as the various night scenes. The LIDAR apparatus, which was operated by a hired Texan company devoted to the device, performed scans of Claire Kuchever's apartment, the ferry, the ATF office, and actress Paula Patton, among others. Effects editor Zachary Tucker combined the elements created by the Texan LIDAR company with computer-generated graphics to make possible the scenes of time-travel experienced in the film.

The explosion of the Stumpf was filmed using an actual New Orleans ferry in a portion of the Mississippi River sectioned off especially for the event; the occurrence took over four hours to prepare. Under the supervision of pyrotechnics expert John Frazier, the ferry was coated entirely with fire retardant and rigged with fifty gasoline bombs including black dirt and diesel, each one set to detonate within a five-second range. People and cars were added in later as elements of computer-generated graphics. Chris Lebenzon was largely responsible for moving clips from each of the sixteen cameras in place to create the sensation of an extended explosion sequence. The spectacular explosion actually caused no significant structural damage to the ferry; after a bout of sandblasting and repainting, the ferry was very similar to its previous state. The ferry was returned into service four days after the production of the film's scene concluded. During filming of the underwater car scenes, actual cars were dropped into the water; computer-generated effects were later added, simulating the entities' explosions. Compositing was done on the Autodesk Inferno special effects program.

Similarities between Timothy McVeigh and Carroll Oerstadt
Jim Caviezel's character, Carroll Oerstadt, seemed to mirror in several ways the story of Timothy McVeigh, a domestic terrorist who destroyed the Alfred P. Murrah Federal Building in Oklahoma City with a bomb in 1995. Caviezel and Scott did not deny this, and both admitted that the Oerstadt character was at least partly based on McVeigh. Ross Johnson of The New York Times also compared the ferry bombing at the film's beginning to the Oklahoma City bombing.

Home media
Déjà Vu was released on DVD and home video approximately five months after its release in American theaters, on April 24, 2007. In the two weeks succeeding the day of the DVD's release, the film was the second most purchased DVD in the United States. It was second only to Night at the Museum during this period in time.

Special features on the disc include an audio commentary from director Tony Scott for both the film and its deleted scenes. The DVD cover also includes a "Surveillance Window" feature, which includes featurettes on the film's production in New Orleans.

Soundtrack
The track listing for Déjà Vu largely borrows music not originally produced for the film; three of the songs that make an appearance in Déjà Vu uphold elements of soul and gospel. "Don't Worry Baby" by The Beach Boys simulated the actual concept of déjà vu, as detailed in the plot. Songwriters such as Harry Gregson-Williams contributed music to the film; artists like Charmaine Neville and Macy Gray performed music especially for the film. The music featured in the film's trailer was titled "Hello Zepp", the main theme for Saw. The soundtrack was released by Hollywood Records.

Reception

Box office
Déjà Vu premiered in New York City on November 20, 2006, two days before its wide release in all of the United States and Canada. Alongside Mexico, the three countries were the sole nations to open the film in November. The United Kingdom opened the film on December 15, 2006, and was followed shortly thereafter by New Zealand on December 22. Australia was the last English-speaking country where the film premiered, on January 18, 2007.

The film opened in the #3 spot with $20.5 million in 3,108 theaters, an average of $6,619 per theater. Déjà Vu ran for fourteen weeks, staying in the top ten for its first three weeks. It grossed $64 million in the United States and Canada and $116.5 million in other territories for a worldwide total of $180.6 million, against a production budget of $75 million. These earnings made Déjà Vu the 23rd most successful film of 2006 worldwide.

Critical response
On review aggregator Rotten Tomatoes, Déjà Vu has an approval rating of 55% based on 160 reviews and an average rating of 5.92/10. The site's critical consensus reads, "Tony Scott tries to combine action, science fiction, romance, and explosions into one movie, but the time travel conceit might be too preposterous and the action falls apart under scrutiny." On Metacritic, the film has a score of 59 out of 100, based on 32 reviews, indicating "mixed or average reviews".

Joel Siegel of ABC News called the film technically "well-made," but criticized its attempt to describe a supposedly scientific basis for time travel as both silly and dull, as did Manohla Dargis of The New York Times, who additionally found the depiction of parishes decimated by Hurricane Katrina "vulgar". Todd Gilchrist from IGN rated the film eight out of ten, calling it a "bravura set piece", despite an ending that "feels inappropriate given the urgency (and seeming inevitability) of the story's dénouement." Likewise, Michael Wilmington of the Orlando Sentinel rated the film three out of four stars, citing the "good cast, Tony Scott's swift direction, and unyielding professionalism" as rationale for his rating. Kenneth Turan of the Los Angeles Times described the film's exploration of the nature of time and the implications of time travel as having been a "sci-fi staple for generations".

Criticism
Both Terry Rossio and Bill Marsilii have acknowledged that the film was not shot the way they had wanted it to be, shifting the blame to director Tony Scott and his goal to focus more on the action aspect of the film than on the more meaningful plot the screenplay had called for. Marsilii, although "quite critical of the mistakes made," said he was proud of the finished product. Rossio, however, was so put off during filming that he, as of May 2008, had not seen the film. Rossio complained that Scott had ignored the inclusion of important plot details from the screenplay whenever "there was something he wanted to do" instead. In the DVD commentary, Scott admits that he thought he did a mediocre job shooting [the chase scene].

Rossio and Marsilii believe that many of the negative reviews of Déjà Vu are a direct result of Scott's direction of the film, and have stated that "Tony Scott added nothing to Déjà Vu and made several hundred small mistakes and about eight or nine deadly mistakes", which makes the film seem like it has many unforgivable plot holes, when it should not have had any. "[T]here are no plot holes at all, and scrutiny reveals the plot to be air tight." says Rossio. "We had years to think of all this and work it out." It was felt there were many misunderstandings that Scott's take on the plot introduced into the film. In his own defense, Scott cited in an interview with Iain Blair of BNET that only nineteen weeks were provided for the production of the film, which "isn't a lot for a film like Déjà Vu."

Awards
Although reviews from critics were mixed, Déjà Vu was nominated for six different awards, winning one. Déjà Vu was nominated for the Saturn Award in the category "Best Science Fiction Film", but lost to Children of Men.

Paula Patton, who played Claire Kuchever, was nominated for "Best Breakthrough Performance" for the Black Reel Awards. The award was won by Brandon T. Jackson for his performance in the film Roll Bounce.

Harry Gregson-Williams, the composer of the film's soundtrack, was nominated for the "Film Composer of the Year" division of the World Soundtrack Academy Awards (the award was won by Alexandre Desplat for his score with The Queen).

Déjà Vu received two nominations pertaining to the "Best Fire Stunt" and the "Best Work with a Vehicle", while it won the International Gold Reel Award at the Nielsen EDI Gold Reel Awards ceremonies.

See also
 List of films featuring time loops
 Wormholes in fiction
 Deus ex machina

References

External links

 
 
 

2006 films
2006 action thriller films
2006 science fiction action films
2000s American films
2000s English-language films
2000s science fiction thriller films
American action thriller films
American chase films
American science fiction action films
American science fiction thriller films
American spy films
Bureau of Alcohol, Tobacco, Firearms and Explosives in fiction
Films about the Federal Bureau of Investigation
Films about terrorism in the United States
Films about time travel
Films directed by Tony Scott
Films produced by Jerry Bruckheimer
Films scored by Harry Gregson-Williams
Films set in 2006
Films set in New Orleans
Films shot in Los Angeles
Films shot in New Orleans
Films with screenplays by Terry Rossio
Scott Free Productions films
Techno-thriller films
Time loop films
Touchstone Pictures films